Chang Kai-chen and Chuang Chia-jung were the defending champions, but both chose to participate, but with different partners. Chang competed with Hsieh Shu-ying, but lost in the first round to Chen Yi and Varatchaya Wongteanchai, meanwhile Chuang competed with Olga Govortsova, but lost in the quarterfinals to Karolína Plíšková and Kristýna Plíšková.

Chan Yung-jan and Zheng Jie won the title defeating Karolína Plíšková and Kristýna Plíšková in the final 7–6(7–5), 5–7, [10–5].

Seeds

Draw

Draw

References
 Main Draw

OEC Taipei Ladies Open - Doubles
Taipei WTA Ladies Open